William Scott O'Connor (May 23, 1864 – January 16, 1939) was an American epee and foil fencer who competed in the 1904 Summer Olympics. He won the silver medal in the singlestick competition. He was born in Pittsburgh, Pennsylvania and died in Manhattan.

References

External links
 profile

1864 births
1939 deaths
American male épée fencers
Fencers at the 1904 Summer Olympics
Olympic silver medalists for the United States in fencing
Medalists at the 1904 Summer Olympics
American male foil fencers